Mravyan or Mrravyan may refer to:

Askanaz Mravyan, leader of Soviet Armenia
Yeghipatrush, formerly named Mravyan